Trevor White (born 1985) is an American producer, director and writer whose films include King Richard and Ingrid Goes West. 

In 2022, White was nominated, along with his brother Tim and Will Smith, for an Academy Award for Best Picture for King Richard but did not win.

White joined the Academy of Motion Picture Arts and Sciences and the Producers Guild of America in 2022, and is also a member of the Directors Guild of America. He routinely shares producer duties with his brother, Tim White.

Early life
White grew up in Annapolis, Maryland, where he attended The Key School. His mother, Patti, is a documentary film maker and is director and co-founder of the Annapolis Film Festival. White attended Cornell University as an undergraduate, graduating in 2007. He was a member of the Sigma Pi fraternity.

Filmography
All listings come from the Internet Movie Database.

Accolades

References

External links
 
 

1985 births

Living people
American film producers
American film directors
Cornell University alumni